Ways of Escape is ostensibly the second volume of autobiography by British novelist Graham Greene, first published in 1980, but it is not a conventional autobiography, concentrating more on the author's work than his life and often blurring the line between the two.

Overview
Ways of Escape is the autobiography of a writer rather than a man. Instead of recounting the details of his life he gives the histories of his novels. How they came to be written, what he had intended to convey in those novels and whether or not he believed he succeeded. He also details the sources of his characters and the ways in which he sought to disguise those characters in order to protect the originals. There are plenty of anecdotes detailing various escapades around the world, though the way Greene describes them it is as though he were struggling to stave off terminal boredom rather than merely have a good time. Sometimes mildly heroic, often seedy, with these stories of his life he describes his lifelong ennui, his frequent bouts of depression and his endless search for meaning in a life he often appears to view as meaningless. The reader is left with the impression that the author lived a very interesting and varied life but not a happy one.

References

1980 non-fiction books
British autobiographies
Books by Graham Greene
The Bodley Head books